Chanda Rubin and Brenda Schultz-McCarthy were the defending champions but did not compete that year.

Rika Hiraki and Nana Miyagi won in the final 6–4, 6–1 against Marianne Werdel-Witmeyer and Tami Whitlinger-Jones.

Seeds
Champion seeds are indicated in bold text while text in italics indicates the round in which those seeds were eliminated.

 Amanda Coetzer /  Lindsay Davenport (first round)
 Amy Frazier /  Kimberly Po (semifinals)
 Katrina Adams /  Mariaan de Swardt (first round)
 Rika Hiraki /  Nana Miyagi (champions)

Draw

External links
 1997 IGA Classic Doubles Draw

U.S. National Indoor Championships
Iga Classic - Doubles, 1997
IGA Classic